Deoptilia is a genus of moths in the family Gracillariidae.

Etymology
Deoptilia is derived from the Greek deo (meaning bind) and ptilia (small wing).

Species
Deoptilia heptadeta  (Meyrick, 1936) 
Deoptilia syrista  (Meyrick, 1926)

References

External links
Global Taxonomic Database of Gracillariidae (Lepidoptera)

Acrocercopinae
Gracillarioidea genera